Arayha Suparurk (born 15 May 1994), more commonly known as Coco, is a Thai-Austrian model and beauty pageant titleholder, who was crowned Miss Grand Thailand 2019.

Early life and education
Suparurk was born to an Austrian father and a Thai mother who later on separated. She received a bachelor’s degree in Communication Arts from Dhurakij Pundit University.

Career
Suparurk was 1st runner-up at Miss Thailand World 2011.

Suparurk competed on the second season of The Face Thailand in 2015, as one of the 5 member of team Lukkade Metinee. She end up eliminated in the semi-final.

She was crowned Miss Grand Thailand in 2019, and was 2nd runner-up at Miss Grand International that same year.

During the question round of the Miss Grand International 2019, she was asked: "What is the best thing you can think of, from Venezuela to tell to the world, and why?" She responded:
 
The best thing for me in Venezuela is you. Everyone, if no you here no Venezuela. Te amo Venezuela, muchas gracias.

Controversy
During the 2019 Miss Grand Thailand pageant, Suparurk was condemned for posting body-shaming comments against Filipino model and Miss Universe 2018 Catriona Gray on social media. Suparurk would subsequently file cyberbullying charges against three internet users following her trending comments.

Filmography

Television dramas
 2018 Kaew Kumpun (แก้วกุมภัณฑ์) (Dee One TV/Ch.3) as Kun Nai (คุณนาย)
 2018 Prakasit Kammathep (ประกาศิตกามเทพ) (Dee One TV/Ch.3) as Sindy (Cameo) (ซินดี้ (เลขาของเสี่ยสาม) (รับเชิญ))
 2020 Pom Arthun 2020 (ผมอาถรรพ์) Dee One TV(/Ch.3) as Go Go (Model) (Cameo) (โกโก้ (นางแบบ) (รับเชิญ))
 2020 Lady Bancham (เลดี้บานฉ่ำ) (The One Enterprise/One 31) as Meda (Cameo) (มีนลดา เพชรรัตน์นาราศร (เมดา) (รับเชิญ))
 2021 Talay Duerd (ทะเลเดือด) (/Ch.7) as Ann (Cameo) (แอน (รับเชิญ))
 2022 Sisa Marn (2022) (ศีรษะมาร) (Bear In Mind Studios/Ch.8) as Éclair (Cameo) (เอแคลร์ (รับเชิญ))

Television series
 20  (/) as

Television sitcom
 20  (/) as

Movie
 2019  (1325 เลขเป็น เลขตาย) as 
 2020  (นาคีทวิภพ) as

MC
 Online 
 2021 : เอิ๊กอ๊ากไปกับมิส EP.1 ตะลุยสำเพ็ง On Air YouTube:Coco Arayha CHANNEL

References

External links

1994 births
Living people
Arayha Suparurk
Arayha Suparurk
Arayha Suparurk
Arayha Suparurk
Arayha Suparurk
Miss Grand International contestants

Arayha Suparurk
Arayha Suparurk
Arayha Suparurk
Arayha Suparurk
Arayha Suparurk